The Thuli River, former name Tuli River, is a major tributary of the Shashe River in Zimbabwe.  It rises near Matopo Mission, Matobo District, and flows into the Shashe River near Tuli village.

Hydrology 

The Thuli is an ephemeral river, with declining annual unit runoff.

Major tributaries of the Thuli River include the Mtshabezi, Mtshelele, Sengezane river and Mwewe Rivers.

The Thuli River below Thuli-Makwe Dam is a sand filled channel, with alluvial aquifers in the river channel.

Towns along the river 

The Thuli River passes through no major settlements, only the following business centres:

 Freda Mine
 Guyu
 Manama
 Chelesa, Zimbabwe [Sengezane]

Bridges and crossings 

There are five main bridges over the Mzingwane River:

 Bridge on Old Gwanda Road, between Matombo Mission and Blanket Mine.
 Bridge on Gwanda - Kezi road, below Thuli-Makwe Dam.
 Elliot Bridge, upstream of Guyu.
 Bridge on Manama - Kafusi road.
 Mankonkoni Bridge on Tuli - Kafusi road. This bridge was destroyed by Cyclone Eline.

There are also a number of fords and crossing points, including:

 Ntalale causeway, which was badly damaged by Cyclone Eline.
 Causeway below Thuli gorge

Development 

In addition to a number of small weirs, there is one major dam on the Thuli River:

 Thuli–Makwe Dam, west of Gwanda. It is located near the confluence with the Mtshelele River and supplies water for irrigation.

The Mtshabezi River (the principal left-bank tributary) is dammed at Mtshabezi, Sheet and Blanket. Mtshabezi Dam will augment the water supply for the City of Bulawayo, once a connecting pipeline has been completed. Sheet and Blanket Dams supply water to the City of Gwanda and Blanket and Vubachikwe Mines.

Two additional dam sites have been selected further downstream:

 Thuli–Moswa, where no development has taken place.
 Thuli–Manyange, upstream of Elliot Bridge, where construction was briefly started in 2007 but is now halted.

References 

 
Rivers of Zimbabwe
Shashe River